Centerville/Centreville is the name of some places in the US state of Pennsylvania:
Centerville, Crawford County, Pennsylvania
Centerville, Washington County, Pennsylvania
Centreville, the original name of the village of Penns Creek, Pennsylvania
Centreville, the original name of the village of Kersey, Pennsylvania
Centreville, the original name of the borough of Slippery Rock, Pennsylvania